CELF may refer to:

CE Linux Forum, Consumer Electronics Linux Forum
Clinical Evaluation of Language Fundamentals
CELF, a group of proteins
‘Art’ in the Welsh language

See also:

CELF1 (gene)
CELF2 (gene)
CELF4 (gene)